Samangan-e Olya (also Romanized as Samangān-e ‘Olyā; also known as Samangan) is a village in Hojr Rural District, in the Central District of Sahneh County, Kermanshah Province, Iran. At the 2006 census, its population was 432, in 109 families.

References 

Populated places in Sahneh County